Trinity Episcopal Church is a historic Episcopal congregation and church, designed by Toledo, Ohio architect Charles Crosby Miller and constructed ca. 1865  in Fort Wayne, Indiana. The congregation was organized in 1839 as Christ Church and the name changed in 1844 to Trinity Church. The first church was built on the northwest corner of Berry and Harrison Streets in 1850. It is an example of Gothic Revival architecture.

It was listed on the National Register of Historic Places in 1978.

References

Further reading
John D. Beatty  Beyond These Stones: a History of Trinity Episcopal Church, Fort Wayne, Indiana Edition: Sesquicentennial ed. Binding: Hardcover Publisher: Trinity Episcopal, Fort Wayne, IN Date published: 1994

External links
 Trinity Episcopal Church website

Episcopal church buildings in Indiana
Churches on the National Register of Historic Places in Indiana
Gothic Revival church buildings in Indiana
Churches completed in 1865
National Register of Historic Places in Fort Wayne, Indiana
Churches in Fort Wayne, Indiana